LIM domain and actin-binding protein 1 is a protein that in humans is encoded by the LIMA1 gene.

EPLIN is a cytoskeleton-associated protein that inhibits actin filament depolymerization and cross-links filaments in bundles (Maul et al., 2003).[supplied by OMIM]

References

Further reading